The National Security Council (NSC) is the principal forum of the president of the Philippines considering national security and foreign policy matters with his senior national security advisors and cabinet officials.

The NSC consists of two distinct bodies – the Council Proper and the National Security Council Secretariat.

The council proper is a collegial body chaired by the President. It includes concerned officials of the Cabinet and Congress, as members, as well as other government officials and private citizens who may be invited by the president.

The council was created during the Quirino Administration through Executive Order (EO) No. 330, dated July 1, 1950. It was reorganized by virtue of EO No. 115, series of 1986.

The NSC secretariat is a permanent body that provides technical support to the council proper. It is headed by the Director-General and the National Security Adviser.

History
Commonwealth Act No. 1 is the original policy basis of the national security program of the Republic of the Philippines. That act mandated the establishment of a Council of National Defense to advise with the President on all matters of national defense policy, with membership consisting of the President, all living former Presidents, the Vice President, the head of each executive department, the Chief of Staff, and six other members to be designated by the President.

Subsequent to World War II, which included a period during which the Commonwealth government operated as a  government in exile, and subsequent to the recognition of the Republic of the Philippines as a sovereign nation, President Elpidio Quirino established the National Security Council as a body so named.

The 1987 Constitution mandates civilian control of the military and establishes the president as commander in chief of the armed forces. The President also heads the National Security Council, ostensibly the policy-making and advisory body for matters connected with national defense. Former President Corazon Aquino reestablished the council in 1986 through an executive order that provided for a National Security Council director to advise the president on national security matters and for a National Security Council Secretariat. The council itself is composed of the president and at least nine others: the Vice President; the AFP chief of staff; National Security Council director; the Executive Secretary; and the Secretaries of Foreign Affairs, National Defense, Interior and Local Government, Justice, and Labor and Employment (called ministers before 1987). By the end of 1990, however, the National Security Council had only convened twice.

Responsibility for national security was vested in the Department of National Defense. The principal functions of the department in 1991 were to defend the state against internal and external threats and, through the Philippine National Police, to maintain law and order. The Secretary of National Defense, by law a civilian, was charged with advising the president on defense matters and developing defense policy.

In 2002, President Gloria Macapagal Arroyo won crucial backing from her cabinet and the Congress for the deployment of US soldiers in the country as part of the war on terrorism. The President convened a meeting of the country's National Security Council during that time, in a bid to pull wavering officials, including her vice-president into line and smooth over differences in her administration over the issue. Arroyo insisted her oppositions to marshal support for her stance to back a U.S.-led campaign against terrorism, not only to implement a unanimous UN Security Council resolution calling on U.N. members to bring the perpetrators to justice but also the Philippines' strategic alliance with the United States and to assist the global campaign to end the scourge of terrorism.

In 2016, the President Rodrigo Duterte convened the National Security Council and discussed his major initiatives —the war on illegal drugs, peace talks with communist and Moro rebels and the territorial disputes with China.

The National Security Advisor (NSA) and Director-General serve as Chief of Staff and adviser for Special Concerns in National Security to the President.  The NSA has a Cabinet rank in the government. The current Director-General and National Security Adviser is Sec. Eduardo Año.

Functions
The NSC's function is to advise the President with respect to the integration of domestic, foreign, and military policies relating to national security.  It is also said that it serves as the President's principal arm for coordinating these policies among various government departments and agencies in matters involving national security

Composition
As provided in the Administrative Code of 1987, the council is composed of the President as chairman, the Vice-President, the Secretary of Foreign Affairs, the Executive Secretary, the Secretary of National Defense, the Secretary of Justice, the Secretary of Labor and Employment, the Secretary of Local Governments, the National Security Director, the Chief of Staff of the Armed Forces of the Philippines (AFP), and such other government officials and private individuals as the President may appoint. However, the same law allows the President to reorganize the administrative structure of the Office of the President.

In 1992, President Fidel Ramos reorganized the council to include the Secretaries of Science and Technology, Trade and Industry, Finance, and Environment and Natural Resources, and the Director-General of the National Economic and Development Authority.

In 2001, President Gloria Macapagal Arroyo amended Ramos' Executive Order and reconstituted the council to its present form.

Council
As of January 2023, the members are as follows:

Executive committee
The executive committee reviews national security and defense problems and formulates positions or solutions for consideration by the council. It determines the council's agenda and order of business and ensures that decisions of the council are clearly communicated to the agencies concerned. It advises the President on the implementation of decisions. As of January 2023, its members are:

See also
Department of National Defense (Philippines)
National Intelligence Coordinating Agency
Council of State

References

External links
 

Government agencies under the Office of the President of the Philippines
Military of the Philippines
Philippines
Government agencies established in 1950
Establishments by Philippine executive order